Huseyngulu Mammadov — was a Georgian politician of Azerbaijani origins.

Life 

He was born in 1875, Mughanlo village of Signakh Uyezd, then part of Tiflis Governorate in Russian Empire to an ethnic Azerbaijani (then called Tatars) peasant family. He was a member of the Russian Social-Democratic Workers' Party from 1899. He co-founded Muslim Social Democratic Party's Tbilisi branch in 1904. He was one of the signatories to The Act of Independence of Georgia on May 26, 1918.

In 1919 he became only Azerbaijani to be represented in Constituent Assembly of Georgia, from Social Democratic Party of Georgia. In March 1919, together with Giorgi Anjaparidze, Samson Pirtskhalava and Petre Surguladze, he was elected to a special commission set up to study the causes of the Akhaltsikhe uprising.

He knew Georgian fluently and often contributed to Ertoba newspaper. He was also active in promoting Georgian sovereignty claim over disputed Zaqatala Governorate against Azerbaijan, despite his origins. He actively worked in various commissions set up to solve the problems related to the Muslims of Georgia.

He remained in Georgia after Red Army invasion of Georgia. No further information has been found about his whereabouts later.

References 

Georgian Azerbaijanis
Social Democratic Party of Georgia politicians
Russian Social Democratic Labour Party members
People from Tiflis Governorate
Democratic Republic of Georgia
1875 births
1920s deaths